Belarus competed at the 2004 Summer Olympics in Athens, Greece, from 13 to 29 August 2004. This was the nation's fifth appearance at the Summer Olympics in the post-Soviet era. The Belarus Olympic Committee sent a total of 151 athletes to the Games, 82 men and 69 women, to compete in 22 sports.

The Belarusian team featured two defending Olympic champions: discus thrower Ellina Zvereva and single sculls rower Ekaterina Karsten. Along with Zvereva and Karsten, shooters Sergei Martynov, Kanstantsin Lukashyk, and Igor Basinski, and married couple Iryna Yatchenko and Igor Astapkovich competed at their fourth Olympic Games, although they first appeared as part of either the Soviet Union (Martynov and Basinski in 1988) or the Unified Team (Astapkovich, Yatchenko, Lukashyk, and Karsten in 1992). Notable Belarusian athletes featured professional tennis player Max Mirnyi, table tennis star Vladimir Samsonov, gymnast Ivan Ivankov, Russian-born judoka Anatoly Laryukov, and Greco-Roman wrestler Siarhei Lishtvan. Three-time Olympic champion and wrestling coach Alexander Medved became the nation's flag bearer in the opening ceremony.

Belarus left Athens with a total of 13 Olympic medals (2 gold, 5 silver, and 6 bronze), failing only one gold short of the total achieved in Sydney. Three of these medals were awarded to the athletes in weightlifting, and two each in rowing and boxing for the first time. Five Belarusian athletes set the nation's historical record to win Olympic medals for the first time, including judoka Ihar Makarau in the men's half-heavyweight division, track cyclist Natallia Tsylinskaya in the women's time trial, and sprinter Yulia Nestsiarenka, who became the first non-American to claim the Olympic title in the women's 100 metres since 1980.

Originally, Belarus had won a total of fifteen medals at these Games to match its record with Atlanta. On December 5, 2012, hammer thrower Ivan Tsikhan and discus thrower Iryna Yatchenko stripped off their silver and bronze medals respectively as being ordered by the International Olympic Committee, after drug re-testings of their samples were found positive.

Medalists

|  style="text-align:left; width:72%; vertical-align:top;"|

| style="text-align:left; width:23%; vertical-align:top;"|

Archery 

Two Belarusian archers (one man and one woman) qualified each for the men's and women's individual archery.

Athletics 

Belarusian athletes have so far achieved qualifying standards in the following athletics events (up to a maximum of 3 athletes in each event at the 'A' Standard, and 1 at the 'B' Standard).

On December 5, 2012, hammer thrower Ivan Tsikhan and discus thrower Iryna Yatchenko stripped off their silver and bronze medals respectively as being ordered by the International Olympic Committee, after drug re-testings of their samples were found positive.

Men
Track & road events

Field events

Combined events – Decathlon

Women
Track & road events

Field events

Combined events – Heptathlon

Boxing 

Belarus entered six boxers in 2004. They won a pair of silver medals, with a combined record of 9-6 in competition.  Belarus ranked 6th in the medals chart for boxing.

Canoeing

Belarus sent five canoe teams to Athens.  They competed in seven events, earning a bronze medal in the flatwater men's double kayak 500 metre race.  This put Belarus in a three-way tie for 17th place in the canoeing medal count.

Sprint
Men

Women

Qualification Legend: Q = Qualify to final; q = Qualify to semifinal

Cycling

Road

Track
Sprint

Pursuit

Time trial

Omnium

Diving 

Belarusian divers qualified for four individual spots at the 2004 Olympic Games.

Men

Equestrian

Dressage

Fencing

Two Belarusian fencers qualified for the following individual spots:

Men

Women

Gymnastics

Artistic
Men

Women

Rhythmic

Trampoline

Judo

Seven Belarusian judoka (six men and one woman) qualified for the 2004 Summer Olympics.

Men

Women

Modern pentathlon

Three Belarusian athletes qualified to compete in the modern pentathlon event through the European and UIPM World Championships.

Rowing

Belarusian rowers qualified the following boats:

Men

Women

Qualification Legend: FA=Final A (medal); FB=Final B (non-medal); FC=Final C (non-medal); FD=Final D (non-medal); FE=Final E (non-medal); FF=Final F (non-medal); SA/B=Semifinals A/B; SC/D=Semifinals C/D; SE/F=Semifinals E/F; R=Repechage

Sailing

Belarusian sailors have qualified one boat for each of the following events.

Women

M = Medal race; OCS = On course side of the starting line; DSQ = Disqualified; DNF = Did not finish; DNS= Did not start; RDG = Redress given

Shooting 

Nine Belarusian shooters (five men and two women) qualified to compete in the following events:

Men

Women

Swimming 

Belarusian swimmers earned qualifying standards in the following events (up to a maximum of 2 swimmers in each event at the A-standard time, and 1 at the B-standard time):

Men

Women

Synchronized swimming

Two Belarusian synchronized swimmers qualified a spot in the women's duet.

Table tennis

Four Belarusian table tennis players qualified for the following events.

Tennis

Belarus nominated two male tennis players to compete in both singles and doubles.

Weightlifting 

Eight Belarusian weightlifters qualified for the following events:

Men

Women

Wrestling 

Men's freestyle

Men's Greco-Roman

Women's freestyle

See also
 Belarus at the 2004 Summer Paralympics

References

External links
Official Report of the XXVIII Olympiad
Belarus Olympic Committee 

Nations at the 2004 Summer Olympics
2004
Summer Olympics